Demi Bennett (born 11 October 1996)  is an Australian professional wrestler. She is currently signed to WWE, where she performs on the Raw brand under the ring name Rhea Ripley and is a member of The Judgment Day. She was also the inaugural NXT UK Women's Champion as well as a former NXT Women's Champion, a former Raw Women's Champion and a former WWE Women's Tag Team Champion, making her the only person to have held all four titles, as well as the first female Australian champion in WWE history. She is also the 2023 Women's Royal Rumble winner, becoming the fourth wrestler and the first woman to win a Royal Rumble as the number one entrant.

After competing on the independent circuit under her real name since 2013, Ripley joined WWE as part of the inaugural Mae Young Classic in 2017. After reaching the semi-finals of the 2018 edition of the tournament, she was part of the original roster of NXT UK, becoming its inaugural women's champion in August 2018. After a run on the NXT brand from 2019 to 2021 which saw her win the NXT Women's Championship and become the brand's first member to defend their title at WrestleMania, WWE's flagship event, she moved to Raw, quickly going on to win the Raw Women's Championship at WrestleMania 37.

Professional wrestling career

Independent circuit (2013–2017) 
Bennett began to work in Riot City Wrestling in 2013. She spent several years in the promotion, where she became a two-time RCW Women's Champion. Bennett's New Horizon Pro Wrestling debut was made on 24 May 2014 during the opening night of the NHPW Global Conflict where she joined the Global Conflict Tournament. She was eliminated during the first round of the tournament by Mercedes Martinez. She returned for the second night of the NHPW Global Conflict event, competing in a four way mixed tag team match paired with Garry Schmidt. Six months later, Bennett returned and was part of the opening night of the NHPW Final Chapter event, wrestling a Four Way Match against Madison Eagles, Evie and Saraya Knight with the vacant IndyGurlz Australia Championship at stake. However, Bennett did not win the title.

Bennett made her Melbourne City Wrestling debut on 14 June 2014 at MCW New Horizons where she defended the RCW Women's title in a Three Way match against Savannah Summers and Toni Storm. On 9 August at MCW Clash Of The Titans, Bennett defeated Miami to retain her Women's Championship. Bennett continued her winning streak with a third consecutive victory, defeating Savannah Summers at MCW Fight For A Cause.

On 22 April 2017, Bennett wrestled her last RCW match at RCW Strength where she successfully defended the Women's title against Kellyanne.

WWE

Mae Young Classic (2017–2018) 
In 2017, Bennett signed with WWE, and it was announced that she would compete in the inaugural Mae Young Classic under the new name Rhea Ripley. She defeated Miranda Salinas in the first round but lost to Dakota Kai in the second round.
Ripley made her NXT television debut on 25 October 2017 episode of NXT, participating in a battle royal to determine one of the contenders for the vacant NXT Women's Championship at TakeOver: WarGames on 18 November, which was won by Nikki Cross. Eventually sporting a new look, Ripley competed in the 2018 Mae Young Classic in 2018, showing a new aggressive and disrespectful attitude and establishing herself as a heel in the process; she defeated MJ Jenkins, Kacy Catanzaro, and Tegan Nox in her first three matches but lost to Io Shirai in the semi-finals.

Inaugural NXT UK Women's Champion (2018–2019) 

Shortly after the 2018 Mae Young Classic, Ripley became part of the NXT UK brand as part of the premiere of the newly created NXT UK show.

During the television tapings of the show in August (that aired throughout November), Ripley took part in an eight woman tournament to determine the inaugural NXT UK Women's Champion. She defeated Xia Brookside in the first round, Dakota Kai in the semi-finals, and Toni Storm in the finals to become the inaugural champion. With the win, Ripley became the first female Australian champion in WWE history, and the second Australian champion altogether after Buddy Murphy. Ripley also competed in a dark match before the first ever all women's pay–per–view, Evolution, on 28 October, where she successfully retained her title against Dakota Kai (due to the tournament having yet to air at the time, she was not yet recognized on-screen as champion). Throughout her championship reign, Ripley went on to fend off title contenders such as Isla Dawn and Deonna Purrazzo.

On 12 January 2019 at NXT UK TakeOver: Blackpool, Ripley lost her title to Toni Storm, ending her reign at 139 days and marking her first defeat in the brand. At the Royal Rumble event on 27 January, Ripley made her first appearance on a main roster pay-per-view by entering the women's Royal Rumble match at #24, eliminating Kacy Catanzaro, Dana Brooke, and Zelina Vega before being eliminated by Bayley. Afterwards, Ripley feuded with the debuting Piper Niven for most of 2019 over which one was the most dominant woman in the NXT UK roster. The two faced off in a match on 15 June (aired 3 July), where Niven defeated Ripley. Ripley defeated Niven in a rematch on 31 August (aired 4 September); the two would eventually team up after Ripley saved Niven from an attack by Jazzy Gabert and Jinny, whom they defeated in a tag team match on 4 October. Ripley wrestled her last match in the brand on 5 October 2019 tapings of NXT UK, defeating Nina Samuels.

NXT Women's Champion (2019–2021) 

On 28 August 2019 episode of NXT, Ripley made her surprise return to the brand when she interrupted NXT Women's Champion Shayna Baszler, stating that Baszler may have beaten everyone on NXT, but not her, turning face and beginning a feud between the two in the process.

In parallel to her feud against Baszler, on 1 November episode of SmackDown, Ripley and Tegan Nox were one of the many NXT wrestlers to invade the show, challenging Mandy Rose and Sonya Deville to a tag team match, from which Ripley and Nox emerged victorious. Later that night, Ripley joined Triple H and the rest of the NXT roster as they declared war on both Raw and SmackDown, and vowed to win the 2019 Survivor Series brand warfare. As part of the ongoing storyline, she defeated both Raw's Charlotte Flair and SmackDown's Sasha Banks in a triple threat match on 22 November episode of SmackDown.

At TakeOver: WarGames on 23 November, Ripley led Team Ripley in the first ever women's WarGames match against Team Baszler (Baszler, Io Shirai, Bianca Belair, and NXT UK Women's Champion Kay Lee Ray); despite teammate Dakota Kai turning heel and attacking Tegan Nox before the two even entered the match, leaving Ripley and Candice LeRae in a de facto two-on-four handicap match, Ripley gave her team the victory by pinning Baszler. The following night at Survivor Series, Ripley was part of Team NXT, who defeated Team Raw and Team SmackDown, and the leader of her team in the 5-on-5-on-5 women's elimination match, which her team won after she last eliminated SmackDown captain Sasha Banks, with she, LeRae and Shirai as the survivors.

On 18 December episode of NXT, Ripley defeated Baszler to win the NXT Women's Championship, making her the first person to have won both the NXT Women's and NXT UK Women's Championships. She then successfully defended the title against Toni Storm on 25 January 2020 at Worlds Collide. 

Ripley made an appearance on 3 February 2020 episode of Raw, confronting Royal Rumble winner Charlotte Flair and suggesting that Flair should use her Royal Rumble title opportunity to challenge Ripley for the NXT Women's Championship at WrestleMania 36. Flair appeared in the following episode of NXT to give her answer, but was interrupted by both Bianca Belair, Ripley's future title contender at TakeOver: Portland, and Ripley herself, with the two eventually teaming up and attacking Flair. At the aforementioned event on 16 February, Ripley successfully defended the championship against Belair, and was attacked by Flair, who accepted Ripley's challenge. Ripley then lost the title to Flair on the second night of WrestleMania 36 on 5 April. The day after WrestleMania, WWE announced that Ripley took a hiatus from WWE and returned to Australia due to her visa issues. Ripley returned on 6 May episode of NXT after Flair got herself disqualified in an NXT Women's Championship match against Io Shirai by attacking Flair. A backstage interview with Ripley and Shirai was shown afterward where they began arguing and eventually brawling to be separated by officials. On 7 June at TakeOver: In Your House, Ripley and Flair both lost to Io Shirai in a triple threat match for the NXT Women's Championship. On 18 November episode of NXT, Ripley challenged Shirai for the NXT Women's Championship, but was unsuccessful. On 2 December episode of NXT, Ripley was announced as a member of Shotzi Blackheart's team for the second ever women's WarGames match. 

At New Year's Evil on 6 January 2021, Ripley failed to defeat Raquel González in a Last Woman Standing match, which was her final match in NXT. At the Royal Rumble on 31 January, Ripley entered at #14, scoring 7 eliminations and becoming one of the final two competitors in the match before she was eliminated by eventual winner Bianca Belair.

Main roster beginnings (2021–2022) 
On 22 February 2021 episode of Raw, a video package aired hyping up Ripley's arrival to the brand. Ripley made her main roster debut on 22 March episode of Raw, challenging Asuka to a match for the Raw Women's Championship at WrestleMania 37. Asuka accepted Ripley's challenge and the match was scheduled to take place on the second night of WrestleMania on 11 April. At WrestleMania 37, Ripley defeated Asuka to win the Raw Women's Championship. On the Raw after WrestleMania, Ripley defended the title in a rematch against Asuka, but it ended in a no-contest after interference from Charlotte Flair, who attacked both Asuka and Ripley. On 3 May episode of Raw, a rematch between Ripley and Asuka for the Raw Women's Championship was scheduled for WrestleMania Backlash, but WWE official Sonya Deville added Flair to the match to make it a triple threat match. At the event on 16 May, Ripley successfully retained her title by pinning Asuka. At Hell in a Cell on 20 June, Flair defeated Ripley by disqualification, thus Ripley retained her title. At Money in the Bank on 18 July, Ripley dropped the title to Flair, ending her reign at 98 days. She failed to regain the title in a triple threat match against the champion Nikki A. S. H. and Flair at SummerSlam on 21 August. 

Over the following weeks, Ripley allied with Nikki A. S. H. as a tag team, and on 20 September episode of Raw, they won the WWE Women's Tag Team Championship by defeating Natalya and Tamina. On 22 November episode of Raw, Ripley and A. S. H. lost the titles to Carmella and Queen Zelina, ending their reign at 63 days. Their partnership ended on 10 January 2022 episode of Raw when A. S. H. attacked Ripley. On 7 March episode of Raw, she teamed with Liv Morgan to defeat Zelina and Carmella, adding them to the Women's Tag Team Championship triple threat match at WrestleMania 38 and making it a fatal four-way match. On the second night of the event on 3 April, they failed to win the titles. On 18 April episode of Raw, Ripley and Morgan faced the champions Sasha Banks and Naomi for the titles, but lost. After the match, Ripley attacked Morgan, ending their partnership and turning heel for the first time on the main roster.

The Judgment Day (2022–present) 

At WrestleMania Backlash on 8 May, Ripley cost AJ Styles his match against Edge and was revealed as a member of The Judgment Day. At Hell in a Cell on 5 June, The Judgment Day (Edge, Damian Priest, and Ripley) defeated Styles, Finn Bálor, and Liv Morgan in a six-person mixed tag team match. The next night on Raw, Edge introduced Bálor as the newest member of The Judgment Day; Bálor, Priest, and Ripley suddenly attacked Edge, kicking him out of the stable. Later that night, Ripley won a fatal four-way match to become the number one contender for Bianca Belair's Raw Women's Championship. She was scheduled to face Belair at Money in the Bank on 2 July, but was pulled out of the match after being not medically cleared to compete; she was replaced by Carmella.

On the 25 July episode of Raw, Ripley returned from injury, helping Bálor and Priest attack the Mysterios (Rey and Dominik) in a backstage segment. Ripley accompanied Bálor and Priest to the ring for their match against The Mysterios at SummerSlam on 30 July, which they lost after interference from a returning Edge. Despite interference from Ripley, Bálor and Priest lost to Edge and Rey in a tag team match at Clash at the Castle on 3 September. After the match, Dominik attacked Edge and Rey, turning heel and joining The Judgment Day. On 8 October at Extreme Rules, Dominik, Priest, and Ripley helped Bálor defeat Edge in an "I Quit" match. After the match, Ripley attacked Edge's wife, Beth Phoenix, with a con-chair-to. At Crown Jewel, Bálor, Priest, and Dominik defeated The O.C. (Styles, Luke Gallows, and Karl Anderson) in a six-man tag team match after interference from Ripley. On the following episode of Raw, The O.C. introduced the returning Mia Yim as their solution to counter Ripley. Three weeks later at Survivor Series WarGames on 26 November, Ripley's team lost to Yim's team after Becky Lynch pinned Dakota Kai in a WarGames match. On the 28 November episode of Raw, The Judgment Day defeated The O.C. in an eight-person mixed tag team match to end their feud. On the 19 December episode of Raw, Ripley challenged Akira Tozawa to a match after Tozawa splashed a beverage in Dominik's face during a tag team match between Bálor and Priest against the Street Profits. Ripley went on to win her first intergender match against Tozawa. 

At the Royal Rumble on 28 January 2023, Ripley appeared at ringside during the men's Royal Rumble match to assist her stablemates in their attack on Edge, only to be speared by Edge's wife, Beth Phoenix. Later that night, Ripley won the women's Royal Rumble match from the #1 spot by last eliminating Liv Morgan, who entered the match as #2. With this victory, Ripley became the fourth wrestler (after Shawn Michaels in 1995, Chris Benoit in 2004, and Edge in 2021) and the first woman to win the Royal Rumble as the first entrant. She also spent the longest time in a women's Royal Rumble match at 1:01:08; Morgan was officially recorded as lasting one second less. On the following episode of Raw, Ripley declared that she will challenge Charlotte Flair for the SmackDown Women's Championship at WrestleMania 39. At Elimination Chamber on 18 February, Ripley and Bálor were defeated by Edge and Phoenix in a mixed tag team match.

Other media 
Bennett made her video game debut as a playable character in WWE 2K20 and subsequently in WWE 2K Battlegrounds, WWE 2K22 and WWE 2K23.

Personal life 
Bennett cites watching The Miz as an inspiration growing up. In addition to wrestling, Bennett is also trained in or practices swimming, karate, rugby, netball and football. She is a fan of the Adelaide Football Club.

Bennett is in a relationship with fellow wrestler Matthew Adams, known professionally as Buddy Matthews.

Championships and accomplishments 
 CBS Sports
 Breakthrough Wrestler of the Year (2019)
 Pro Wrestling Illustrated
 Ranked No. 11 of the top 100 female wrestlers in the PWI Women's 100 in 2020
 Riot City Wrestling
 RCW Women's Championship (2 times)
 Sports Illustrated
 Ranked No. 7 of the top 10 women's wrestlers in 2019.
 WWE
 WWE Raw Women's Championship (1 time)
 WWE Women's Tag Team Championship (1 time) – with Nikki A.S.H.
 NXT Women's Championship (1 time)
 NXT UK Women's Championship (1 time, inaugural)
 Women's Royal Rumble (2023)
 NXT UK Women's Championship Tournament (2018)

References

External links 

 
 
 

1996 births
21st-century professional wrestlers
Living people
Sportspeople from Adelaide
Sportswomen from South Australia
Australian female professional wrestlers
Australian expatriate sportspeople in the United States
Expatriate professional wrestlers
NXT UK Women's Champions
NXT Women's Champions
WWE Raw Women's Champions
WWE Women's Tag Team Champions